The 1996 Humboldt State Lumberjacks football team represented Humboldt State University during the 1996 NCAA Division II football season. Humboldt State competed in the Northern California Athletic Conference in 1996.

The 1996 Lumberjacks were led by sixth-year head coach Fred Whitmire. They played home games at the Redwood Bowl in Arcata, California. Humboldt State finished the season with a record of three wins and seven losses (3–7, 1–3 NCAC). The Lumberjacks were outscored by their opponents 159–258 for the season.

Schedule

Notes

References

Humboldt State
Humboldt State Lumberjacks football seasons
Humboldt State Lumberjacks football